Buduma may refer to:

Buduma people of Chad, Cameroon, and Nigeria
Buduma language spoken by that people